"The Woman in the Room" is a short story by Stephen King, first published in King's 1978 collection Night Shift. It was adapted as a short film of the same name in 1983, directed by Frank Darabont at the beginning of his career.

Plot summary
Johnny is burdened with remorse. He decides to euthanize his terminally ill mother with painkillers.

Film adaptation
Director Frank Darabont began his film career by adapting this story as a short film in 1983 as part of the Dollar Baby initiative. Darabont sent King a query letter in 1980 asking for permission to adapt the story. King agreed because he thought that students adapting short stories as films was a good idea.

See also
 Stephen King short fiction bibliography

References

External links

Stephen King Short Movies

Short stories by Stephen King
1978 short stories
Short stories adapted into films